Passalidae is a family of beetles known variously as "bessbugs", "bess beetles", "betsy beetles" or "horned passalus beetles". Nearly all of the 500-odd species are tropical; species found in North America are notable for their size, ranging from 20–43 mm, for having a single "horn" on the head, and for a form of social behavior unusual among beetles.

Bodies elongate-cylindrical and black overall; ventral surfaces may be covered with yellow setae. The head is narrower than the thorax, with antennae consisting of 10 antennomeres with a three-segment club. The elytra are elongate with parallel sides, and heavily striated.

They are subsocial (brood caring) beetles that live in groups within rotting logs or stumps. The beetles will excavate tunnel systems within rotting wood where the females then lay their eggs. They care for their young by preparing food for them and helping the larvae construct the pupal case. Both adults and larvae must consume adult feces which have been further digested by microflora for a time; an arrangement that might be described as a sort of external rumen.

In addition, they are also able to produce fourteen acoustical signals, more than many vertebrates.  Adults produce the sounds by rubbing the upper surface of the abdomen against the hind wings.  The larvae produce the sounds by rubbing the third leg against a striated area on the coxa of the second leg.

While the taxonomy of Nearctic species is well-known (four species in the US, and 90 in Mexico), bess beetles in other parts of the world need further study.

Of North American species, Odontotaenius disjunctus (synonym: Popilius disjunctus) is the familiar bessbug found throughout the eastern US and Canada,  while O. floridanus has only been found in Florida on sand hills that used to be islands when Florida was flooded thousands of years ago.  Ptichopus angulatus was recently discovered near the border of Mexico in Arizona.  Its habitat is south to Colombia and it is commonly associated with the detritus chambers of leafcutter ant nests (Atta spp.). Two other species were reported from Arizona at the beginning of the 20th century, but have not been seen there since that time; they may have been brought from Mexico by a train hauling firewood.

The oldest records of the family go back to the Cretaceous, with the genus Ceracyclus known from two species found in the Cenomanian aged Burmese amber, the genus appears to be closely related to the living genus Cylindrocaulus. The family has been suggested to have a close relationship with the extinct family Passalopalpidae.

Selected species
Genus Aceraius

Aceraius grandis
Genus Aulacocyclus
Aulacocyclus edentulus
Genus Ceracupes
Ceracupes arrowi
Genus Chondrocephalus
Chondrocephalus debilis
Chondrocephalus granulifrons
Genus Cylindrocaulus
Cylindrocaulus patalis
Genus Didimus
Didimus laevis
Didimus parastictus
Genus Heliscus
Heliscus tropicus
Genus Leptaulax
Leptaulax bicolor
Genus Odontotaenius
Odontotaenius disjunctus (patent-leather beetle)
Odontotaenius floridanus
Odontotaenius striatopunctatus
Genus Ogyges
Ogyges laevior
Genus Oileus
Oileus rimator
Genus Passalus
Passalus affinis
Passalus caelatus
Passalus elfriedae
Passalus inops
Passalus interruptus
Passalus interstitialis
Passalus jansoni
Passalus latifrons
Passalus pugionifer
Passalus punctatostriatus
Passalus punctiger
Passalus spiniger
Passalus unicornis
Genus Paxillus
Paxillus leachi
Paxillus pentataphylloides
Genus Pentalobus
Pentalobus barbatus
Genus Petrejoides
Petrejoides orizabae
Genus Popilius
Popilius eclipticus
Genus Proculus
Proculus burmeisteri
Proculus mniszechi
Genus Ptichopus
Ptichopus angulatus
Genus Publius
Publius agassizi
Genus Spasalus
Spasalus crenatus
Genus Spurius
Spurius bicornis
Genus Verres
Verres corticicola
Verres hageni
Genus Veturius
Veturius transversus

See also
Austroplatypus incompertus

Footnotes

References
 Jack C. Schuster, "Passalidae", in Ross H. Arnett, Jr. and Michael C. Thomas, American Beetles (CRC Press, 2002), vol. 2
 BugGuide Passalidae

External links
 Odontotaenius disjunctus on the UF / IFAS Featured Creatures Web site
 Sound recording of Passalidae at BioAcoustica

 
Beetle families